Scalphunter may refer to:

Scalphunter (DC Comics), a DC Comics hero of the Wild West
Scalphunter (Marvel Comics), a Marvel Comics supervillain who is a member of the Marauders
The Scalphunters, a 1968 American Western film

See also
 Scalp (disambiguation)
 Scalping (disambiguation)